This is a list of senators from the state of New South Wales since the Australian Federation in 1901.

List

References

Lists of political office-holders in New South Wales
Senators, New South Wales